The Avon River, an inland intermittent river of the Wimmera catchment, located in the Grampians and Wimmera regions of the Australian state of Victoria. Rising on the northern slopes of the Great Dividing Range, the Avon River flows north-westerly to reach its confluence with the Richardson River. The rivers of the Wimmera catchment drain into a series of ephemeral lakes that, whilst they do not directly empty into a defined watercourse, form part of the Murray River catchment of the Murray-Darling basin.

Location and features
The Avon River descends  over its  course.

Etymology
In a western Kulin Aboriginal language the river and surrounding country is named Wityellibar, from witji "basket grass" bar "river"; and in the Djadjawurrung language, Kurakibiyal, with kurak meaning "sand" and biyal, meaning "red gum".

See also

 List of rivers of Victoria

References

External links

North-Central catchment
Rivers of Grampians (region)
Wimmera
Grampians (national park)